The University City Swimming Pool is located on the Ciudad Universitaria campus of UNAM in Mexico City. For the 1968 Summer Olympics, it hosted some of the water polo competitions.

References

External links
1968 Summer Olympics official report. Volume 2. Part 1. p. 79.

College swimming
Venues of the 1968 Summer Olympics
Olympic water polo venues
Indoor arenas in Mexico
National Autonomous University of Mexico
Sports venues in Mexico City